Burgred (also Burhred or Burghred; Old English: Burhræd) was an Anglo-Saxon king of Mercia from 852 to 874.

Family
Burgred became king of Mercia in 852, and may have been related to his predecessor Beorhtwulf. After Easter in 853, Burgred married Æthelswith, daughter of Æthelwulf, king of the West Saxons. The marriage was celebrated  at the royal villa of Chippenham in Wessex.

Life

In 853 Burgred sent messengers to Æthelwulf, king of the West Saxons, seeking his help to subjugate the Welsh, who lived between Mercia and the western sea, as they were rebelling against his rule. Immediately King Æthelwulf advanced with Burgred against the Welsh, and successfully repressed the rebellion.

Twelve years after Burgred's success against the Welsh, in 865, the Great Heathen Army arrived. Following its successful campaigns against East Anglia and Northumbria it advanced through Mercia, arriving in Nottingham in 867. Burgred then appealed to his brothers-in-law King Æthelred of Wessex and Alfred for assistance against them. The armies of Wessex and Mercia did no serious fighting as Burgred paid them off. In 874 the march of the Vikings from Lindsey to Repton drove Burgred from his kingdom.

After Burgred left, the Vikings appointed a Mercian Ceolwulf to replace him, demanding oaths of loyalty to them. Burgred retired to Rome and died there. He was buried, according to the Anglo-Saxon Chronicle, "in the church of Sancta Maria, in the school of the English nation" (now Santo Spirito in Sassia) in Rome.

Single coins from the reign of Burgred continue to be found but Burgred coins within hoards are less common. In 1998 a hoard with Burgred coins was found by the Birmingham University Field Archaeology Unit near Banbury Castle.

See also
Kings of Mercia family tree

References

Sources
Anglo-Saxon Chronicle: MS A v. 3, Janet Bately (ed.), Brewer, Rochester (NY) 1986, .

External links

 ; probably also 
Burgred coins from Severn Stoke coin hoard

Anglo-Saxon warriors
Mercian monarchs
9th-century English monarchs